Dominic Demschar (born 19 May 1993 in Oberndorf, Austria) is an alpine skier who competed for Australia at the 2014 and 2018 Winter Olympics in the alpine skiing events. He has lived the majority of his life in Park City, Utah, in the United States and attends the University of Utah.

References

1993 births
Australian male alpine skiers
Austrian male alpine skiers
Austrian emigrants to Australia
Alpine skiers at the 2014 Winter Olympics
Alpine skiers at the 2018 Winter Olympics
Olympic alpine skiers of Australia
Living people
People from Salzburg-Umgebung District
Sportspeople from Salzburg (state)
20th-century Austrian people
21st-century Austrian people